Paul J. Gemperline (born 1955) is an American analytical chemist and chemometrician. He is a Distinguished Professor of Chemistry at East Carolina University (ECU) located in Greenville, North Carolina and has been the recipient of several scientific awards, including the 2003 Eastern Analytical Symposium Award in Chemometrics. He is author of more than 60 publications in the field of Chemometrics. Dr. Gemperline served as Dean of the Graduate School at ECU from 2008 to 2022. He retired from ECU June 30, 2022.

Educational background

Gemperline graduated from Cleveland State University with a Bachelor of Science in Chemistry in 1978 and received a Ph.D. in Clinical Bioanalytical Chemistry in 1982. His dissertation was titled, "The Design of the Laboratory Network DISNET."

Scientific career

Gemperline came to the notice of a larger scientific community in 1984 with the publication of a paper describing DISNET in the Journal of Automated Methods and Management in Chemistry. (The journal title was changed to Journal of Analytical Methods in Chemistry in 2013.) Gemperline and his colleagues provided methodologies which underlay the improvements in calibration accuracy, computer-based data acquisition and mathematical analysis in chemometrics. The qualitative advances helped open new scientific fields such as molecular modeling and QSAR, cheminformatics, the ‘-omics’ fields of genomics, proteomics, metabonomics and metabolomics, process modeling and process analytical technology.

Gemperline has been most influential by dispersing knowledge of his Chemometric methodologies through his publications. Better process methods can create inflection points that became the foundation for radical improvements and transitions in the scientific enterprise. It can be decades before the implications of particular advances are intuited, especially those related to the basic training of the next generations of chemists.

Gemperline served as dean of the Graduate School at East Carolina University from 2008 to 2022, and as a chemistry faculty member beginning in 1982. He has held several administrative positions at ECU, including associate vice chancellor for research and graduate studies for seven years.

Gemperline served as the Editor-in-Chief of Journal of Chemometrics for ten years, from 2007 to 2017  The Journal of Chemometrics honored him with a special issue in July 2020.

Awards and honors

1983, 1984 NASA Lewis Research Center Summer Faculty Fellow.
1985, 1986, 1987: Senior Visiting Scientist, Burroughs Wellcome Co.
1987: East Carolina University Sigma XI Helms Award for outstanding Research
1999: East Carolina University Distinguished Research Professor of Chemistry Award, 5-Year Achievement Research/Creative Activity Award
2001: East Carolina University College of Arts and Sciences Distinguished Professor of Chemistry, Lifetime Achievement Award
2003: Eastern Analytical Symposium Award for Achievement in Chemometrics.
2010: Applied Spectroscopy William F. Meggers Award for outstanding paper appearing in Applied Spectroscopy.
2014: Distinguished Alumni Award, Cleveland State University.

Publications

Gemperline is author of more than 60 publications in the field of Chemometrics.

References

External links
 Department of Chemistry at the East Carolina University

Living people
21st-century American chemists
East Carolina University faculty
1955 births